Louis Joseph Baise (born 4 May 1927) was a South African former Olympic wrestler.

Biography
Baise is Jewish, and won gold medals at the 1950 Maccabiah Games and the 1953 Maccabiah Games in Israel.  He competed in the 1952 Summer Olympics in Helsinki for South Africa, coming in 6th in the Men's Flyweight, Freestyle.  Baise won the 1954 British Empire and Commonwealth Games Flyweight (−52.0 kg) Freestyle gold medal in Vancouver.

References

External links

1927 births
Possibly living people
Wrestlers at the 1952 Summer Olympics
South African male sport wrestlers
Olympic wrestlers of South Africa
Wrestlers at the 1954 British Empire and Commonwealth Games
Commonwealth Games gold medallists for South Africa
Place of birth missing (living people)
Maccabiah Games gold medalists for South Africa
South African Jews
Jewish wrestlers
Competitors at the 1950 Maccabiah Games
Competitors at the 1953 Maccabiah Games
Commonwealth Games medallists in wrestling
Maccabiah Games medalists in wrestling
Medallists at the 1954 British Empire and Commonwealth Games